Otto Ollikainen (born 22 January 2001) is a Finnish football player who plays college soccer for West Virginia University.

Career

Collegiate career 
Ahead of the 2021 NCAA Division I men's soccer season, Ollikainen signed a National Letter of Intent to play college soccer for West Virginia University in the United States. Ollikainen made his debut for the university on 26 August 2021, playing 21 minutes in a 2–0 victory against Robert Morris University. On 27 November 2021, he scored his first collegiate goal scoring against University of Tulsa in the third round of the 2021 NCAA Division I Men's Soccer Tournament.

Club career
On 24 January 2020 it was confirmed, that Ollikainen had joined FC Honka on a deal until the end of the year.

References

External links

2001 births
Living people
Finnish footballers
Helsingin Jalkapalloklubi players
Klubi 04 players
Turun Palloseura footballers
FC Honka players
Pallohonka players
Veikkausliiga players
Kakkonen players
Ykkönen players
Finland youth international footballers
Association football midfielders
Finnish expatriates in the United States
Expatriate soccer players in the United States
West Virginia Mountaineers men's soccer players
Footballers from Helsinki